New York Stories is a trilogy of English-language one-act operas (Broken Pieces, Just for the Night, and Cradle Song) by Daron Hagen, with a libretto by Hagen and Barbara Grecki first performed in its entirety by Kentucky Opera in Louisville, Kentucky, on 30 October 2010.

Background and performance history
The operas are based on true stories. The first two skits originated as playlets by Barbara Grecki and were adapted by Hagen as he musicalized them. The third skit libretto is by Hagen and is a self-portrait of himself and spouse Gilda Lyons as new parents. "Hagen’s clever jabs at the state of contemporary classical music as the weary composers struggled with their fussy newborn made for a little inside humor." References are made by Hagen in the libretto to the couple's just having returned from a concert featuring music by Ned Rorem and David Del Tredici, among others. Later, the music quotes Elliott Carter's Third String Quartet and several measures of Rorem's artsong, "Early in the Morning".

Conceived both as a trilogy and as three free-standing skits, the first, Broken Pieces, is charming and romantic, the second, Just for the Night, is soulful and sad, and the third, Cradle Song, is warmly domestic and affectionate. The vocal demands of the three female and three male roles are designed for young artist training programs at professional opera companies and at universities. The composer has stipulated that staging in the theater is not preferable to recital, agitprop, site-specific stagings in private homes, schools, and public spaces. He has also stipulated that the trilogy may be cast with as few as two singers and as many as six, in addition to multiple casting. Each opera lasts approximately 20 minutes. Optional music is included in the score of the complete trilogy for a "pantomime prelude" and scene changes.

Broken Pieces
 Staged premiere: 8 March 2005, by the University of Southern California Opera, Los Angeles, California
 Concert orchestral premiere: 19 February 2007 by Music on the Edge, Pittsburgh, Pennsylvania
 Cabaret premiere: 13 February 2008 by Boston Opera Underground, Boston, Massachusetts

Just for the Night
 Concert premiere: 7 April 2008 by Prism Ensemble, New York, New York
 Semi-staged premiere: 17 June 2009 by Long Leaf Opera, Chapel Hill, North Carolina

Cradle Song
 Semi-staged premiere: 21 October 2008 by University of Puget Sound, Tacoma, Washington
 Concert premiere: 26 October 2008 by the Seasons Music Festival, Yakima, Washington

New York Stories (complete)
 Site-specific staged premiere: 30 October 2010 by Kentucky Opera, Louisville, Kentucky
 Semi-staged concert premiere: 1 November 2011 by Chicago Opera Theater / Chicago College of the Performing Arts, Chicago, Illinois
 Theatrical premiere: 24 February 2012 by the Butler Opera Center, University of Texas, Austin, Texas
 Theatrical premiere with complete orchestration: 13-14 February 2021 by Florida Grand Opera, Miami, Florida

Roles

Synopsis

Broken Pieces
Pamela lives alone with her cat on the Upper West Side of Manhattan. Antonio, an Italian immigrant, arrives to fix the tiles in her bathroom. They share their stories and a romantic moment.

Just for the Night
Christmas Eve on Manhattan's Upper East Side. Middle-aged Babs is surprised by a visit from her brother Chip who, it emerges, has been living in a shelter. When he asks to stay the night, she turns him away.

Cradle Song
A married composer couple, Mama and Papa, live in Hamilton Heights. They arrive home after a night on the town and unsuccessfully attempt to put their child down for the night.

Notes

External links
 Official New York Stories opera website

English-language operas
Operas by Daron Hagen
2010 operas
Operas
Operas set in the United States